Get Off on the Pain is the eighth studio album by American country music artist Gary Allan. It was released on March 9, 2010, via MCA Nashville. The album's first single, "Today", was released in June 2009 and was a Top 20 hit. Its second single, the title track, was released on March 15, 2010 and debuted at number 42 on the U.S. Billboard Hot Country Songs chart. The third single "Kiss Me When I'm Down" was released in September 2010.

Promotion
On August 24, 2009, Allan announced his "Get Off on the Pain tour," in promotion of the album. The 25-city tour started on October 14 in Chicago, Illinois, and concluded on December 31 in Las Vegas, Nevada. Special guests on the tour included Justin Moore, Eli Young Band, Jack Ingram, and Stoney LaRue.

Singles
The first single from the album, "Today," was released on June 12, 2009. The music video for the single was filmed live during a performance from his Get Off on the Pain Tour.

The title track was released as the album's second single in March 2010. It debuted at number 42 on the U.S. Billboard Hot Country Songs chart, and peaked at number 18.

The third and final single from the album, "Kiss Me When I'm Down", was released in September 2010. It peaked at number 38 on the country charts.

Reception

Commercial
Get Off on the Pain debuted at number two on the U.S. Billboard Top Country Albums and number five on the U.S. Billboard 200, selling 65,000 copies in its first week of release. In its second week of release, the album dropped to number sixteen on the Billboard 200 selling 24,341 copies. In its third week of release, the album dropped to number twenty-four on the Billboard 200 selling 15,555 copies. As of August 2010, the album sold 200,395 copies in the U.S.

Critical

Upon its release, Get Off on the Pain received generally positive reviews from most music critics. At Metacritic, which assigns a normalized rating out of 100 to reviews from mainstream critics, the album received an average score of 84, based on 5 reviews, which indicates "universal acclaim".

Giving it four stars out of five, Country Weekly reviewer Jessica Phillips said that the album "reveal[s] an even more authentic, intense layer" of Allan's personality. She wrote that the title track "sets the stage" for the rest of the album, but thought that "Kiss Me When I'm Down" had weak lyrics. Allmusic critic Todd Sterling also gave a four-star rating, saying that "Get Off on the Pain is a well-crafted, ten-song collection that, to steal a well-worn phrase, is all killer and no filler" and referred to it as his best album, saying it "will likely go down as one of the best albums of his career".

Matt Bjorke with Roughstock praised the production of the album, saying "The production of the record is killer and serves to enhance everything that makes Gary Allan one of country music’s true gems" and called it one of the years best country albums, saying "IF there’s an artist recording mainstream country records who is as real as Gary Allan, I have yet to see them and if you like authentic, yet modern, country music then Get Off On The Pain is just about as good an album as you’re likely to find this year or any year". Jon Caramanica with The New York Times positively compared Allan to Johnny Cash with the release, and called the years best country album, saying "[Get Off on the Pain] is the year’s best country album so far, almost as brilliantly anguished as Mr. Allan’s 2003 masterpiece, See If I Care." Bill Friskics-Warren with The Washington Post called the album "terrific" saying "Allan's by turns gruff and tender vocals nevertheless are undeniably country, as is the stolid resilience with which he confronts heartache".

Jim Malec with American Songwriter gave the album a 4 ½ rating, lauding the songwriting on the release, calling it "eternally substantive" saying "... he breathes a fresh layer of depth and realism into what might otherwise be well-worn stories". He also acclaimed the honesty of the album, saying "Get Off On the Pain may not be the world’s most uplifting listening experience, but what it lacks in cheer it makes up in truth. For fans who appreciate outstanding country music that deals with real issues, that fact may just make the album’s title a perfectly appropriate statement". Slant Magazine critic Jonathan Keefe also praised Allan's vocal performance on the album, calling Allan "a singer of real grit and depth". He also remarked that the album is "the most consistent set of songs Allan has yet recorded", and rated the album with four stars out of five. Cody Miller with PopMatters gave it an eight star rating saying it was "contender for year’s end best of list; insightful and rare look into a singer’s psyche, a collection of top-grade Country music or soulful purging. All of them apply, and then some".

Jon Caramanica with The New York Times  placed the album at number six on his "top 10 albums of 2010" saying "Six years after his wife’s death, Mr. Allan has made music to match the hurt. This country singer had a broken voice long before this album, and a sure way with an aching lyric, but here, optimism appears to have been filtered out, leaving only shadows, where Mr. Allan thrives.

Track listing

 Live tracks were recorded at House of Blues Chicago in 2009.

Personnel

Technical
 Gary Allan - Producer
 Craig Allen - Art Direction, Design
 Zach Allen - Assistant
 Joseph Anthony Baker - Photography
 Rob Beckham - Booking
 Greg Droman - Engineer, Mixing, Producer
 Liza Goggins - Hair Stylist, Make-Up
 Carie Higdon - Project Coordinator
 Aaron Kasdorf - Assistant
 Daewoo Kim - Assistant
 Renee Layher - Wardrobe
 John Lytle - Management
 Leslie Richter - Assistant
 Rick Shipp - Booking
 Derek Silverman - Assistant
 Todd Tidwell - Assistant
 Hank Williams - Mastering
 Mark Wright - Producer

Additional musicians
 Gary Allan - Lead Vocals
 David Angell - Violin
 John Catchings - Cello
 Perry Coleman - Background Vocals
 Chad Cromwell - Drums
 Eric Darken - Percussion, Vibraphone
 David Davidson - Violin
 Greg Droman - Electric Guitar
 Dan Dugmore - Acoustic Guitar, Steel Guitar
 Stuart Duncan - Fiddle
 Kenny Greenberg - Electric Guitar
 Wes Hightower - Background Vocals
 Rami Jaffee - Hammond B-3 Organ
 Charlie Judge - Cello
 Steve Nathan - Hammond B-3 Organ, Keyboards, Piano, Wurlitzer
 Russ Pahl - Banjo
 Michael Rhodes - Bass Guitar
 Brent Rowan - Baritone Guitar, Electric Guitar
 Mary Kathryn Van Osdale - Violin
 Kris Wilkinson - Viola, String Arrangements
 John Willis - Acoustic Guitar

Charts

Weekly charts

End of year charts

References

2010 albums
Gary Allan albums
MCA Records albums
Albums produced by Mark Wright (record producer)
Albums produced by Greg Droman